Dinosaur is an animated short film directed and produced by Will Vinton.

In 1987 the film was extended and released on video under the title Dinosaurs!. The new footage stars Fred Savage playing a grade school student named Philip who gives a class report on dinosaurs, with the help of an animated chalkboard and Will Vinton's claymation dinosaurs.

Background
Originally created in 1980, when it was known more simply as Dinosaur, the 17-minute claymation short by Vinton Productions 
would later be used for this 1987 video. The popular short is also played at the Smithsonian Museum and has won numerous awards. This film is also played BOB's request in Rocky Hill, Connecticut at the museum in Dinosaur State Park. It is also played at the Pacific Science Center (in Seattle, Washington) in the Dinosaurs A Journey Through Time exhibit, but cuts out the first two parts and narrows it down to the claymation dinosaur story.

Dinosaurs! was designed as an educational film for young children new to the world of prehistoric life; the video slipsleeve describes the film with "Discover the real monsters who dominated the earth for millions of years!" The cartoon animation of the chalkboard is used to elaborate on attributes such as the extinction of the dinosaurs as well as their brain capacity, while the Vinton claymation illustrates, in a colorful and simplistic manner, the brutal lives of the many dinosaurs. The movie also introduces a music video for the song "Mesozoic Mind" by Charmer, featuring cartoon dinosaurs performing it.

Plot
The video—with beginning scenes filmed in 1987—begins with a young boy named Phillip (played by Fred Savage) sitting in his bedroom, listening to loud music, and struggling to find an idea for a class report on a science topic. While struggling to find some ideas, and irking his mother (who threatens to call his father if he does not turn off the music and go to bed) with his loud music, he plays a song on his boom box (titled "Mesozoic Mind"). And the song provides him with an inspiration for his report: DINOSAURS!

Philip then goes to sleep and has a dream, where he discovers that the search for the truth about these magnificent animals and their astonishing 160-million-year success on Earth is probably the most fascinating speculation there is. Phillip then finishes his report and presents it to the class. The class report is then covered through the 1980 claymation short Dinosaur by Will Vinton Productions.

Awards
 Chicago International Film Festival, 1980
 Gold Hugo
 Gold Award, Houston International Film Festival, 1980

References

External links
 MesozoicMind.com—Give me a Mesozoic Mind...
 
 
 Overview of the Dinosaur Documentary
  

1980 animated films
1980 films
1987 animated films
1987 films
Films using stop-motion animation
Museum educational materials
Smithsonian Institution publications
Films about dinosaurs
American animated short films
1980s English-language films
1980s American films